The International Journal of Computer Vision (IJCV) is a journal published by Springer. The senior editor-in-chief is Jean Ponce, and the editors-in-chief are Jiri Matas, Yasuyuki Matsushita, and Svetlana Lazebnik.

References

Computer science journals
Publications established in 1987
Springer Science+Business Media academic journals
English-language journals